Salem Heights is an unincorporated community in Pleasant Township, LaPorte County, Indiana.

References

Unincorporated communities in LaPorte County, Indiana
Unincorporated communities in Indiana